Heidar is a class of boats built and operated by Iran, mainly for maritime patrol and search and rescue missions.

Design 
Hull of Heidar boats is made of Aluminum. The boats are capable of self-righting.

History 
The class is manufactured at Shahid Darvishi Marine Industries of the Marine Industries Organization.

In July 2019, some vessels of this class were commissioned into the fleet of Border Guard, and in May 2020 an unknown number joined the Navy of the Islamic Revolutionary Guard Corps.

References 

Ship classes of the Islamic Revolutionary Guard Corps
Auxiliary search and rescue ship classes
Ships built at Shahid Darvishi shipyard